This is a List of airports in Somaliland, sorted by location.

See also
 List of airports by ICAO code: H#HC - Somalia

References
Airports in Somalia

Airports in Somaliland
Somaliland
Somaliland
Airports